Walker–Warburg syndrome (WWS), also called Warburg syndrome, Chemke syndrome, HARD syndrome (Hydrocephalus, Agyria and Retinal Dysplasia), Pagon syndrome, cerebroocular dysgenesis (COD) or cerebroocular dysplasia-muscular dystrophy syndrome (COD-MD), is a rare form of autosomal recessive congenital muscular dystrophy. It is associated with brain (lissencephaly, hydrocephalus, cerebellar malformations) and eye abnormalities. This condition has a worldwide distribution. Walker-Warburg syndrome is estimated to affect 1 in 60,500 newborns worldwide.

Presentation
The clinical manifestations present at birth are generalized hypotonia, muscle weakness, developmental delay with intellectual disability and occasional seizures. The congenital muscular dystrophy is characterized by hypoglycosylation of α-dystroglycan.
Those born with the disease also experience severe ocular and brain defects. Half of all children with WWS are born with encephalocele, which is a gap in the skull that will not seal. The meninges of the brain protrude through this gap due to the neural tube failing to close during development. A malformation of the a baby's cerebellum is often a sign of this disease. Common ocular issues associated with WWS are abnormally small eyes and retinal abnormalities cause by an underdeveloped light-sensitive area in the back of the eye.

Genetics

Several genes have been implicated in the etiology of Walker–Warburg syndrome, and others are as yet unknown. Several mutations were found in the protein O-Mannosyltransferase POMT1 and POMT2 genes, and one mutation was found in each of the fukutin and fukutin-related protein genes. Another gene that has been linked to this condition is Beta-1,3-N-acetylgalactosaminyltransferase 2 (B3GALNT2).

Diagnosis
Laboratory investigations usually show elevated creatine kinase, myopathic/dystrophic muscle pathology and altered α-dystroglycan. Antenatal diagnosis is possible in families with known mutations. Prenatal ultrasound may be helpful for diagnosis in families where the molecular defect is unknown.

Prognosis
No specific treatment is available. Management is only supportive and preventive.
Those who are diagnosed with the disease often die within the first few months of life. Almost all children with the disease die by the age of three.

Eponym
WWS is named for Arthur Earl Walker and Mette Warburg (1926-2015), a Danish ophthalmologist. Its alternative names include Chemke’s syndrome and Pagon’s syndrome, named after Juan M. Chemke and Roberta A. Pagon.

References

Further reading

External links 

Autosomal recessive disorders
Muscular dystrophy
Congenital disorders
Syndromes affecting the nervous system
Syndromes
Enzyme defects
Rare diseases
Congenital disorders of glycosylation